Rudolf Amelunxen (30 June 1888 – 21 April 1969) was a German politician of the Zentrum and the 1st Minister President of North Rhine-Westphalia between 23 August 1946 and 17 June 1947. He was born in Cologne and died on 21 April 1969 in Grafschaft Abbey, North Rhine-Westphalia.

From 1926 to 1932 he was the regional president of the Westphalian Münster Region, however, furloughed after the Putsch in Prussia. On 5 July 1945, the British military government appointed him upper president of the Province of Westphalia, an office he held until Westphalia merged in North Rhine-Westphalia in 1946.

External links
Online
 

1888 births
1969 deaths
Politicians from Cologne
Centre Party (Germany) politicians
Members of the Landtag of North Rhine-Westphalia
Ministers-President of North Rhine-Westphalia
People from the Rhine Province
Members of the Bundestag for North Rhine-Westphalia
Members of the Bundestag 1949–1953
Provincial Presidents of Westphalia